The 2015 season was Valur's 95th season in Úrvalsdeild and their 11th consecutive season in top-flight of Icelandic Football.

Along with the Úrvalsdeild, the club competed in the Lengjubikarinn and Borgunarbikarinn.

Ólafur Jóhannesson head coached the team after signing a 3-year contract following the departure of Magnús Gylfason on 6 October. He was by former Valur player Sigurbjörn Hreiðarsson. Ólafur and Sigurbjörn coached Haukar in the 2014 season.

On 15 August Valur won the Borgunarbikarinn after beating KR in the final 2–0.

Valur ended the season in 5th place in the league. Patrick Pedersen won the golden boot with 13 goals in 20 games.

First team

Transfers and loans

Transfers In

Transfers Out

Loans in

Loans out

Pre-season

Reykjavík Cup
Valur took part in the 2015 Reykjavík Cup, a pre-season tournament for clubs from Reykjavík.

The team played in group B along with Leiknir R, Víkingur R, ÍR and Þróttur R. Valur finished second in the group behind Leiknir R with 7 points, 2 wins, 1 draw and 1 defeat. Kristinn Freyr was the highest goalscorer in the group with 6 goals.

In the semi final game against Fjölnir, Sigurður Egill scored the only goal to put Valur through to the finals.

On 9 February Valur won Leiknir R in the final 3–0. Sigurður Egill scored the first goal on the 8th minute and Kristinn Freyr doubled the scoring on the 27th minute from the penalty spot. On the 37th minute Sigurður Egill was sent off after getting his second yellow card for a dive. Valur held on and managed to score their third goal through Þórður Steinar following a corner.

Lengjubikarinn
Valur were drawn in group 3 in the Icelandic league cup, Lengjubikarinn, along with ÍA, Stjarnan, Keflavík, Grindavík, Haukar, Fjarðabyggð and Þór.

Valur finished second in the group behind ÍA with 5 wins and 2 draws, 17 points. Patrick Pedersen was their highest goalscorer with 6 goals in 6 games.

On 16 April Valur lost to Breiðablik in the quarter-finals 5–1. Patrick Pedersen scored Valur's only goal from the spot on the 42nd minute to level the score 1–1. Breiðablik than took all control of the game and scored 4 more goals.

Úrvalsdeild

League table

Matches

Summary of results

Points breakdown
 Points at home: 17
 Points away from home: 16
 6 Points: Fylkir, Keflavík
 4 Points: KR
 3 Points: Leiknir R, FH, ÍA, Stjarnan
 2 Points: Fjölnir, ÍBV
 1 Point: Víkingur R
 0 Points: Breiðablik

Borgunarbikarinn
Valur came into the Icelandic cup, Borgunarbikarinn, in the 32nd-finals and were drawn against Selfoss. Valur won the game comfortably 4–0, with a hat trick from Patrick Pedersen.

In the 16th-finals the team was drawn against Fjarðabyggð. Valur won the game 4–0.

In the quarter finals Valur was drawn against Víkingur R. Valur won the game 2–1 with Iain Williamson scoring the winning goal in the 80th minute.

On 7 July Valur was drawn against KA in the semi-finals. Valur won the tie on penalties after the game had ended 1–1. Valur had controlled most of the game but only managed to score one goal, an equaliser through Orri Sigurður after Elfar Árni had put KA ahead on the 6th minute.

Valur became Borgunarbikarinn champions on 15 August after defeating KR 2–0 in the final. Bjarni Ólafur opened the scoring on the 72nd minute with a header following a corner and Kristinn Ingi secured the win on the 87th minute. This was Valur's 10th Cup win with the last one coming in 2005.

Squad statistics

Goalscorers
Includes all competitive matches.

Appearances
Includes all competitive matches.
Numbers in parentheses are sub appearances

Disciplinary record
Includes all competitive matches.

References

External links
 Valur Official Site

Valur (men's football) seasons
Valur